Obispeño (also known as tilhini) was one of the Chumash Native American languages previously spoken along the coastal areas of California. The primary source of documentation on the language is from the work of linguist J. P. Harrington.

Classification
Obispeño is classified as the sole member of the northern branch of the Chumashan language family.

Geographic distribution
Obispeño was spoken in the region of San Luis Obispo, California.

References

External links
 Obispeño language — overview at the Survey of California and Other Indian Languages.
 Language-archives.org: OLAC resources in and about the Obispeño language
 California Language Archives: Obispeño language
 Obispeño language at the Northern Chumash tribe website

Chumashan languages
Indigenous languages of California
Extinct languages of North America
Languages extinct in the 1910s
History of San Luis Obispo County, California